Tarif Saikh Ahmed (born 2 May 1982) is a former Indian professional footballer who played as a striker. He spent most of his career with Mumbai based club ONGC. He had also played for Mohun Bagan, Mohammedan S.C., Tollygunge Agragami, and Mahindra United. Ahmed also played internationally for India from 2006 to 2007.

Club career
Born in Kolkata, West Bengal, Ahmed began his career with National Football League side Mohun Bagan after coming through their youth side. After just one season however, Ahmed left Mohun Bagan to join local rivals Mohammedan. He spent one season with Mohammedan before moving once again to Tollygunge Agragami. He scored his first goal in the National Football League with Tollygunge on 10 April 2005. His 83rd minute goal against Churchill Brothers however was not enough as his side would lose 2–4. Tollygunge Agragami were then relegated after the 2004–05 season and Ahmed returned to Mohammedan who were promoted to the NFL themselves.

In 2007, Ahmed joined ONGC in Mumbai and joined Mahindra United on loan in the newly formed I-League. During the 2007–08 season, Ahmed scored just once, against Sporting Goa on 14 December 2007.

While with ONGC, Ahmed also represented West Bengal in the Santosh Trophy. In 2009, Ahmed helped ONGC earn promotion to the I-League by finishing as champions in the I-League 2nd Division. Ahmed also finished the season as the 2nd Division second best scorer. In 2012, Ahmed began to captain West Bengal in the Santosh Trophy.

In 2015, Ahmed moved back to West Bengal to play for Southern Samity in the Calcutta Football League. By 2017, Ahmed was back playing with ONGC in the local leagues.

International career
Ahmed has three international caps representing India. He made his senior debut on 15 November 2006 in an 2007 AFC Asian Cup qualifier against Yemen. He came on as a substitute for Manjit Singh as India were defeated 1–2.

Coaching career
In May 2019, Ahmed participated in the AIFF "D" Coaching License course in Kolkata.

Personal life
Ahmed is the older brother of Indian international midfielder Jewel Raja.

Career statistics

International

Honours

índia
 Nehru Cup: 2007

ONGC
I-League 2nd Division: 2010

References

1982 births
Living people
People from Kolkata
Indian footballers
Association football forwards
Mohun Bagan AC players
Mohammedan SC (Kolkata) players
Tollygunge Agragami FC players
ONGC FC players
Mahindra United FC players
Southern Samity players
National Football League (India) players
I-League players
I-League 2nd Division players
Footballers from Kolkata
India international footballers
India youth international footballers